Tan Sri Dr. Koh Tsu Koon (born 26 August 1949) is a Malaysian politician. He was the Chief Minister of Penang from 1990 to 2008 and was appointed as a Senator; a member of the Dewan Negara, the upper house of the Malaysian Parliament. In April 2009, Koh was appointed Minister in the Prime Minister's Department by Prime Minister Najib Razak. He was famously known for contributing in the Sungai Pinang campaign where he took almost 10 years and failed to complete it.

He was the fourth president of Parti Gerakan Rakyat Malaysia (Gerakan), a member of the opposition Barisan Nasional (BN) coalition, and also the first President of Gerakan not named a candidate in the Malaysian General Election.

Background
Koh Tsu Koon was born in Penang in 1949 and attended Phor Tay Primary School, Chung Ling High School and Methodist Boys’ School. He graduated from Princeton University in 1970 with a degree in physics, and obtained his PhD from the University of Chicago in 1977 in economics and sociology of education. He was a Fulbright scholar at Stanford University from 1980 to 1981.

Koh taught at University of Science, Malaysia (USM), Penang from 1975 and rose to become Deputy Dean of Education in 1978.

Political career
Koh joined Gerakan in 1982. He won a parliamentary seat during the 1982 general election but lost it to Lim Kit Siang in the following 1986 general election. The following year, he was elected Gerakan Youth chairman. Koh was the protégé of then Penang Chief Minister Lim Chong Eu, serving as Lim's political secretary and chief aide from 1986 to 1990.

Gerakan leadership
Koh became a vice-president of Gerakan in 1991 and later deputy president in 2005. On 8 April 2007, following the retirement of long-serving president Lim Keng Yaik, he took over the presidency in an acting capacity. He was formally elected president in 2008.

Penang Chief Minister
In the 1990 general election, Chief Minister Lim Chong Eu lost his state seat. Koh, who was a first-term state assemblyman from Tanjung Bungah, was selected to lead the Barisan Nasional government in Penang, and became the state's third Chief Minister.

Koh served four terms as Chief Minister for a total of 18 years from 1990 to 2008. In the 1995 general election, he was challenged in his state seat by Lim Kit Siang, who unseated the previous Chief Minister Lim Chong Eu in 1990. Koh beat Kit Siang with over 70% of the votes. He stepped down in 2008 to contest the Batu Kawan parliamentary seat during the general election. Koh was said to be pressured into leaving his position as Chief Minister to join federal politics. He eventually lost the parliamentary contest, while the opposition pact led by the Democratic Action Party (DAP) won the state of Penang.

Koh remained visible in the political scene after the election, and even participated in a televised public debate with his successor as Chief Minister, Lim Guan Eng. He remained as Gerakan president, winning the post permanently in October 2008.

Cabinet minister
Koh returned to public office in April 2009, when he was appointed as a Senator in the Dewan Negara. This paved the way for prime minister Najib Razak to name Koh in his inaugural Cabinet. He was appointed Minister in the Prime Minister's Department, in charge of unity and performance management. Koh was put in charge of Najib's Government Transformation Programme (GTP), which includes monitoring the performance of ministries and six national key result areas (NKRAs) through Key Performance Indicators (KPIs).

Stepping down as Penang BN leader
In August 2011, The Malaysian Insider reported that the central government of Putrajaya felt that Koh should step down as BN leader in Penang for the coalition to win back the state government in the 13th general elections. It was further said that voters viewed Koh as indecisive and a symbol of the BN leadership which was rejected by voters in 2008. Gerakan leaders reportedly encouraged Koh to leave Penang to contest the Simpang Renggam parliamentary seat, a Gerakan safe seat in Johor.

Resignation
On 16 May 2013, The Star reported that Koh officially resigned as the President of Gerakan. His deputy, Chang Ko Youn, would take over as acting president until the party elections on 26 October 2013. Koh's resignation followed Gerakan Secretary-General Teng Chang Yeow's earlier resignation as Penang Barisan Nasional chairman and Gerakan Secretary-General.

Election results

Honours

Honours of Malaysia
  :
  Commander of the Order of Loyalty to the Crown of Malaysia (PSM) – Tan Sri (1995)

References

External links
 Y.B. Senator Tan Sri Dr. Koh Tsu Koon Website

|-

 

1949 births
People from Penang
Living people
Academic staff of Universiti Sains Malaysia
Chief Ministers of Penang
Parti Gerakan Rakyat Malaysia politicians
Malaysian Buddhists
Malaysian people of Hokkien descent
Malaysian people of Chinese descent
Malaysian politicians of Chinese descent
Princeton University alumni
University of Chicago alumni
Stanford University alumni
Members of the Dewan Negara
Members of the Penang State Legislative Assembly
Government ministers of Malaysia
Penang state executive councillors
Commanders of the Order of Loyalty to the Crown of Malaysia
Fulbright alumni